Princess Catherine Ivanovna of Russia (12 July 1915 (O.S.) – 13 March 2007) was a great-great-granddaughter of Tsar Nicholas I of Russia and a niece of King Alexander I of Yugoslavia. She was the last member of the Imperial Family to be born before the fall of the dynasty. She was also second cousin of Prince Philip, Duke of Edinburgh, as Catherine's grandfather Grand Duke Konstantin Konstantinovich of Russia was younger brother of Prince Philip's grandmother Olga, Queen of Greece. Her relation to Prince Philip makes her a second cousin, once removed of King Charles III of the United Kingdom. She is also the grandmother of actor Sebastian Arcelus.

Life
Born in Pavlovsk Palace, she was the second child of Prince John Konstantinovich of Russia and Princess Helen of Serbia. After the Revolution, her father was arrested and deported from the capital and her mother followed her husband into exile. Catherine and her brother, Vsevolod, remained in the care of her grandmother, the Grand Duchess Elizaveta Mavriekievna of Russia. On 18 July 1918, their father, Prince John, was killed, and their mother, Princess Jelena, was arrested and spent several months in Soviet prisons. Grand Duchess Elizabeth was able to take Catherine and her brother to Sweden. Sometime later, they were reunited with their mother.

The family lived in Yugoslavia, then moved to England. There, Catherine received an excellent education, although she never learned the Russian language because her mother, devastated by her husband's death, did not want her children speaking that language in front of her.

Marriage 
From 1937 to 1945, Princess Catherine Ivanovna lived in Italy, with her great-aunt Queen Elena. During her stay she married the Italian diplomat Ruggero Farace, Marchese di Villaforesta (4 August 1909 - 14 September 1970), in Rome on 15 September 1937; on occasion of her wedding, she renounced to her succession rights to the Russian throne.

Farace di Villaforesta family
Marchese Ruggero Farace Farace di Villaforesta (1909-1970) was son of Alfredo, Marchese Farace di Villaforesta (1860-1949), member of an old Sicilian noble family and Greek aristocrat Caterina Fachiri (1882-1968), who was descendant of some of the most prominent Phanariote families of Constantinople, such as Rallis, Vlastos, Mavrocordato and Rodocanachi. This made her also related to former ruling families of Wallachia & Moldavia. Through mutual descent from Princes of Mavrocordato Ruggero was distantly related to Queen Natalia of Serbia (1859-1941), Princess Aspasia of Greece and Denmark (1896-1972) and her daughter Queen Alexandra of Yugoslavia (1921-1993), who was married to his wife's first cousin, King Peter II of Yugoslavia (1922-1970). Ruggero had one younger brother, Don Alessandro Alfredo dei Marchesi Farace di Villaforesta (1911-1998), and one younger sister, Donna Lydia dei Marchesi Farace di Villaforesta (b. 1921), who had married a noted writer, Count Giovanni Turgi-Prosperi (1906-1988).

Children
They had three children:
Nobile Nicoletta Farace (b. Rome, Italy, 23 July 1938); married on 25 March 1966 to Alberto Grundland. They had two children: 
Eduardo Alberto Grundland (b. 15 January 1967); married on 15 November 1999 to Maria Ester Pita Blanco and had one son.
Alexandra Gabriella Grundland (b. 17 September 1971); married on 24 March 2001 to Roberto Castro Padula and had one son.
Nobile Fiammetta Farace (b. Budapest, Hungary, 19 February 1940); married firstly on 16 September 1969 to Victor Carlos Arcelus (divorced in 1980) and secondly in 1981 to Nelson Zanelli. She had three children:
Victor John Arcelus (b. 24 November 1973).
Sebastian Carlos Arcelus (b. 5 November 1976), married on 16 October 2007 to Stephanie Janette Block and had one daughter:
Vivienne Helena Arcelus (b. January 19, 2015)
Alessandro Zanelli (b. 31 July 1984).
Giovanni Farace, Marchese Farace di Villaforesta (b. Rome, Italy, 20 October 1943); married on 14 February 1968 to Marie-Claude Tillier-Debesse (b. Paris, 1944) and had two sons:
Alessandro Farace (b. 29 August 1971).
Yann Farace (b. 4 October 1974); married on 4 September 2009 to Anne-Sophie Laignel and had one son:
 Tancredi Farace di Villaforesta (b. Bruxelles, Belgium, 20 October 2010)

Later life
In 1945, after the end of the World War II, Princess Catherine separated from her husband (although they never legally divorced) and moved with her children to South America. In later years, she lived in Montevideo, capital city of Uruguay.

Death 
She died on 13 March 2007 in Montevideo, Uruquay.

Honours
  House of Romanov: Dame Grand Cordon of the Imperial Order of Saint Catherine.

Ancestry

References

Bibliography

1915 births
2007 deaths
Princesses of royal blood (Russia)
British emigrants to Italy
White Russian emigrants to Yugoslavia
Italian emigrants to Uruguay
Russian people of Serbian descent
House of Holstein-Gottorp-Romanov